Paclín is a  department of Catamarca Province in Argentina.

External links
Paclín Webpage  (Spanish)

Departments of Catamarca Province